Betaenone A, like other betaenones (B and C), is a secondary metabolite isolated from the fungus Pleospora betae, a plant pathogen. Of the seven phytotoxins isolated in fungal leaf spots from sugar beet (Beta vulgaris), it showed 73% growth inhibition.

References 

Decalins
Tertiary alcohols
Primary alcohols
Vinylogous carboxylic acids